Hindu College Colombo or Colombo Hindu College is a Tamil language National School situated at Bambalapitiya, in the suburb of Colombo, Sri Lanka. It was founded in 1951. This school was started with the name of "பிள்ளையார் பாடசாலை" (Pillayar Paadasaalai) by Justice C. Nagalingam Q.C.  Colombo Hindu College is now considered one of the most prominent Tamil national schools in the city of Colombo due to its reputation in the way of providing education. Mr. K. Manimarphan is the current principal of the school, who took charge as the position of principal on 9 October 2020.

In March 2019, the P. Sara Oval was chosen to host its first school cricket Big Match, well known as the 10th Battle of the Hinduites between Colombo Hindu College and Jaffna Hindu College, a stadium which was adopted as temporary home ground for Colombo Hindu College.

Services

The school provides Tamil and English medium education for pupils aged 6 to 19 years in its Primary and Upper sections. The school consists of Primary section to Advanced Level section. In 2006, there were over 4500 students and 120 teachers. Nearly all the buildings are purpose-built and include the Science Laboratories, the Computer Room, the Library, and the Art facilities.

History
The college started as பிள்ளையார் பாடசாலை (Pillayaar School) on 12 February 1951 by The Hindu Educational Society, Colombo with 55 students with 2 teachers. But now it's standing high with over 4000 students and 250 teachers as the school is regarded as one of the leading government national schools in the country. The first principal of this school was Mr. Pathmanathan.

The school has four main houses namely; Kambar, Valluvar, Barathi and Illango (the four most important historians in Tamil language history) which are used to represent the students at the Sports meet which is held annually. The school anthem was written in 1976 mentioning these four houses in the anthem. Recently Navalar house is added to the sport houses in accordance to the current number of students at Hindu College.

On 19 September 2016, the school's first practice pitch was opened and cricketers such as Lasith Malinga and Nuwan Kulasekara were invited as chief guests for this historical moment.

Around 2018, Construction for a Sports Complex began along with a Swimming Pool.

During 2020, School's main playground was enlarged by Hindu College's Principal at that time, Mr. T.P. Parameshwaran Sir.

School flag and emblem 
The official school flag was designed and introduced by the first principal of the school, Pathmanathan. The flag has three horizontal stripes, gold in the centre and rest of brown. The college emblem is placed in the centre of the gold stripe. The Hindu College Colombo emblem depicts the motto of the school "கற்றாங்கு ஒழுகுக" "Follow what you study".

Notable alumni

References

External links

https://www.youtube.com/watch?v=q6g0_A2ybIk

National schools in Sri Lanka
Schools in Colombo
Educational institutions established in 1951
1951 establishments in Ceylon